Anil Kumar Koneru (died April 26, 2019) was an Indian film producer who produced many Telugu films.

Biography
Koneru produced Allari Bullodu in 2005. He also produced films like Sriramachandrulu, Ottesi Chepthunna and Radha Gopalam.

Koneru died of cancer in a Hyderabad hospital on 26 April 2019.

Selected filmography
 Sriramachandrulu (2003)
 Ottesi Chepthunna (2003)
 Radha Gopalam (2005)
 Allari Bullodu (2005)

References

Telugu film producers
2019 deaths
Deaths from cancer in India
Year of birth missing